Persatuan Sepakbola Payakumbuh (simply known as Persepak Payakumbuh or Persepak) is an Indonesian football club based in Payakumbuh, West Sumatra. They currently compete in the Liga 3 and their homeground is Kubugadang Stadium.

References

External links
Persepak Payakumbuh Instagram

Football clubs in Indonesia
Football clubs in West Sumatra